

Dean's Blue Hole is a blue hole located in The Bahamas in a bay west of Clarence Town on Long Island and is the world's second deepest, after the Dragon Hole in the South China Sea, with a depth of .

Formation
A blue hole is a water-filled sinkhole with the entrance below the water level. They can be formed in different karst processes, for example, by rainwater soaking through fractures of limestone bedrock onto the watertable. Sea level here has changed: for example, during the glacial age during the Pleistocene epoch (ice age), some 15,000 years ago, sea level was considerably lower.

References

External links

Landforms of the Bahamas
Sea caves
Marine geology
Underwater diving sites in the Caribbean
Long Island, Bahamas
Sinkholes of North America